Frank Steinhäuser is a German coxswain. 

Steinhäuser coxed for Wolfgang Neuß and Klaus-Günter Jordan from 1962 to 1964. At the 1962 West German national championships, they won gold and thus qualified for the inaugural World Rowing Championships. At the 1962 World Rowing Championships in Lucerne, they became the first world championship titleholders in coxed pair. At the 1963 West German national championships, they again won the title. At the 1964 West German national championships, they came third.

Steinhäuser is a member of RC Nassovia Höchst and in 2012, he was awarded a prize for 50 years of membership at the rowing club.

References

Year of birth missing (living people)
Living people
West German male rowers
World Rowing Championships medalists for Germany
Coxswains (rowing)
European Rowing Championships medalists